George Adams (6 June 1804 – 29 October 1873) was the only son of the Bounty Mutineer John Adams. He was born to his wife Teio, who had once been the wife of William McCoy and was the mother-in-law of Charles Christian, on Pitcairn Island. Adams was born at a time when all the original mutineers apart from his own father had been killed, or in the case of Ned Young, died of natural causes. In 1808 the Pitcairn colony was discovered and the elder Adams was granted amnesty for his part in the mutiny. Both of Adams' parents died in March 1829, when George was 24 years old. Adams served as Chief Magistrate on Pitcairn in 1848. Adams was an opponent of Joshua Hill in the 1830s. Adams opposed the decision to move to Norfolk Island in the 1850s, due to his granddaughter being ill. Adams did eventually move, and died on Norfolk Island in 1873.

References

Pitcairn Islands people
Pitcairn Islands people of English descent
Pitcairn Islands people of Polynesian descent
Pitcairn Islands politicians
1804 births
1873 deaths